Anadelosemia is a genus of snout moths. It was described by Harrison Gray Dyar Jr. in 1919.

Species
Anadelosemia condigna Heinrich, 1956
Anadelosemia senesciella Schaus, 1913
Anadelosemia texanella (Hulst, 1892)

References

Phycitinae
Moth genera